Rabbi Gedaliah Nadel (1923–2004) was an influential rabbi in Israel's Haredi community. He was known for being one of the heads of Kollel Chazon Ish and was the leading authority of Jewish Law in the Chazon Ish neighborhood of Bnei Brak. He was celebrated as an expert in all facets of Torah and Talmudic knowledge.

Biography

Gedaliah Nadel was born in Šiauliai, Lithuania to Rabbi Reuven Keshel. In 1936, his family immigrated to Mandatory Palestine and settled in the Balfouria Colony in what is now Northern Israel. After briefly studying in a yeshiva in Tel Aviv, he transferred to the Lomza Yeshiva in Petach Tikvah where he studied under Rabbi Elazar Menachem Shach. As a child, Gedaliah was known for his diligence and devotion to studying Torah, reportedly studying for up to eighteen hours consecutively. Afterwards Gedaliah studied under Rabbi Avrohom Yeshaya Karelitz, known as Chazon Ish, who molded him into his principal student (recalling his time with the Chazon Ish, Rabbi Nadel said that the Chazon Ish garnered knowledge in medical science by reading medical journals).

Rabbi Nadel married the daughter of Rabbi Eliyahu Weiner, a student of the Chofetz Chaim. Following the wedding, they lived in Jerusalem for a short while, before moving to Bnei Brak where he lived an ascetic life. When the Chazon Ish decided to establish a special community of religious devotees, he chose Rabbi Gedaliah Nadel to lead the community. As leader of the community, such leaders as Rabbi Yaakov Yisrael Kanievsky (the Steipler), and his son Rabbi Chaim Kanievsky, turned to Rabbi Nadel for decisions. Rabbi Nadel's house was used as a gathering place for the Rabbinic personalities of his day, such as Rabbi Shach and the Steipler. Rabbi Nadel also briefly served as the Rosh Yeshiva of the Vishnitz Hasidic yeshiva.

Rabbi Nadel would learn Maimonides' Guide for the Perplexed immediately after praying Shacharis vatikin.

He died on June 5, 2004.

Opinions 

Rabbi Nadel asserted that certain concepts mentioned in the Torah and Talmud that were not of a legalistic nature were not necessarily to be taken literally. His writings were analyzed and taken into account during the Slifkin affair. Jewish British zoologist Rabbi Natan Slifkin's acceptance of evolution and belief "that the world was billions of years old" is reportedly in accordance to views espoused by Rabbi Nadel. According to Marc Shapiro, Rabbi Nadel maintained that it is acceptable to believe that the Zohar was not written by Rabbi Shimon bar Yochai and that it had a late authorship.

Rabbi Nadel's teachings have continued to exert influence on Haredi leaders.

Works
Many of Rabbi Nadel's lectures were collected by his various students and two volumes were published under the title Shiurei Reb Gedaliah.'B'Torato Shel Rav Gedaliah is a compilation of teachings prepared, which according to the book, is taken from Rabbi Nadel's from audio recordings and published at his request.  It was published by Rabbi Yitzchak Sheilat, one of Rabbi Nadel's main students, and at the personal request of Rabbi Nadel.B'Torato Shel Rav Gedaliah'' was banned by three prominent Bnei Barak rabbis because of its support of Darwin's theory of evolution, including sentences such as "Regarding [the idea that] the creation of man in the image of God marked the end of a long process which started with a non-cognizant animal which gradually evolved until this creature was given a human mind... this is an accurate description. Darwin's proofs, and those of geologists, for the existence of early stages of mankind, seem convincing."

In 5772 (or 2010/2011 CE), Rabbi Sheilat published a new edition of the book.

References

External links
 B'Torato Shel Rav Gedaliah (from http://seri-levi.com/2008/11/13/mito/)
 Rabbi Nathan Slifkin, Part I of Partial Translation of B'Toraso Shel R' Gedaliah
 Rabbi Nathan Slifkin, Part II of Partial Translation of B'Toraso Shel R' Gedaliah

1923 births
2004 deaths
Israeli Orthodox rabbis
People from Bnei Brak
People from Šiauliai
Rabbis in Bnei Brak
Lithuanian emigrants to Mandatory Palestine